Lollards Pit, located just outside the old city boundary of the English city of Norwich, was the place where Lollards, and later a number of Marian martyrs, were burned at the stake for heresy. The condemned would be led across Bishop Bridge—and thus outside of the old city walls—to be executed.

References

History of Norwich
Lollardy